The April 2005 attacks were three related incidents that took place in the city of Cairo, Egypt, on 7 April  and 30 April 2005.  While the first killed three bystanders, the latter two incidents are generally considered to have been minor, in that they caused no loss of life other than those of the perpetrators and appear not to have been planned in advance. Neither sophisticated methods nor sophisticated materials were used in the incidents, and the Egyptian authorities have consistently described the attacks as "primitive".

First incident: Khan el-Khalili

On Thursday, 7 April 2005, a suicide bomber detonated an explosive device on Sharia al-Moski in Islamic Cairo, near the al-Hussein Mosque and Khan el-Khalili, a major souq popular with tourists and Egyptians alike. Three foreign tourists (two French and one American) [(Alex Merandette)] were killed, and 11 Egyptians and seven other overseas visitors were injured.

Egyptian police identified the bomber as Muhammad Sobhi Ali Jidan, originally from Qalyubia Governorate in northern Egypt, but then living in the north Cairo district of Shobra.

Second incident: The Sixth of October Bridge

The first of a number of attacks on Saturday, 30 April  took place at 15h15 Egypt summer time (12h15 UTC) in a city bus station located in a 300-metre-wide concourse between the Ramses Hilton Hotel and the Egyptian Museum near Cairo's main traffic intersection.

Ehab Yousri Yassin, an Egyptian man suspected of involvement in the 7 April attack, was being pursued along the Sixth of October Bridge, a flyover leading into centre of Cairo from the River Nile island of Gezira. He apparently leapt from the bridge down into the bus station below, with a 
nail bomb that he was carrying detonating as he fell. 
The bomber was killed and seven passersby were injured: three Egyptians and four foreign tourists (an Israeli couple, an Italian woman, and a Swedish).

Third incident: The Citadel

Approximately two hours later the same day, two veiled females armed with guns opened fire on a tourist bus in the neighbourhood known as Islamic Cairo, not far from the Citadel. After firing on the coach, one of the women shot the other dead before turning her gun on herself. Three bystanders were reportedly injured. 

Police sources later revealed that the women were Negat Yassin, Ehab Yousri Yassin's sister, and  Iman Ibrahim Khamis, his wife  (described as his fiancée in some early reports). This was the first attack in modern Egyptian history to be carried out by women; police believe it arose from a spur of the moment decision taken by the women upon learning of the Sixth of October Bridge incident.

Casualties

Aftermath
Two groups claimed responsibility in the early evening hours, local time: 
the Mujahedeen of Egypt and  the Abdullah Azzam Brigades. 
In its statement, the latter group said the attacks were in retaliation for the government's clampdown on dissidents in the wake of the Sinai Peninsula bombings of October 2004. 

In the early hours of Sunday, 1 May, security forces arrested some 225 individuals for questioning, mostly from the dead three's home villages and from the area where they lived in Shubra. Particularly keenly sought was Muhammad Yassin, the teenage brother of Ehab Yousri Yassin, whom the police described as the only remaining suspect in the bazaar bomb attack and a material witness to the Saturday afternoon shooting. Muhammad was later extradited from Libya.

Over the course of the weekend, it also emerged that all three of the attackers involved in the attacks were relatives of  Ashraf Said, a suspect in the 7 April bombing who was taken in for questioning and died in police custody on Friday, 29 April.

On August 20, 2007, four suspects were sentenced to life in prison for their role in the attacks. Five others received shorter jail sentences.

On March 9, 2007, one of the American victims published a book (The Only Road North) of his party's exploits in Africa which culminates in the tragic events of April 7, 2005.

See also
2004 Sinai bombings, October 7, 2004
Sharm el-Sheikh bombings, July 23, 2005
2006 Dahab bombings, April 24, 2006
2009 Khan el-Khalili explosion, February 22, 2009

References

External links
Cairo bombing claims third victim (BBC News, 11 April)
Cairo tourists come under attack (BBC News, 30 April)
Tourists targeted in Cairo attacks (AP, via The Guardian)
200 held in Cairo swoop on militants (The Guardian, 2 May)
Egypt Questions 200 Over Attacks, Hunts Suspect (Washington Post, 2 May)

Spree shootings in Egypt
Terrorist incidents in Egypt in 2005
Improvised explosive device bombings in Egypt
2000s in Cairo
Crime in Cairo
April 2005 events in Africa
Suicide bombings in Egypt
2005 murders in Egypt
2005 murders in Asia
Building bombings in Egypt
Attacks in Egypt in 2005